Liushi Subdistrict is a subdistrict in Dongyang, Jinhua, Zhejiang, China. , it has one residential community and 22 villages under its administration.

See also 
 List of township-level divisions of Zhejiang

References 

Township-level divisions of Zhejiang
Dongyang